Combined Joint Task Force – Operation Inherent Resolve (CJTF–OIR) is a multinational military formation established by the U.S.-led international coalition against the Islamic State with the stated aim to "degrade and destroy" the organization. Led by United States Army Central (ARCENT), it is composed of military forces and personnel from over 30 countries.

Formed in October 2014 by U.S. Central Command, CJTF-OIR was intended to replace the ad hoc arrangements that had been established to coordinate operations against ISIL, following its rapid gains in Iraq in June. Its central military action, Operation Inherent Resolve, consists of campaigns in Iraq, Syria, and Libya. The current commander of the coalition is U.S. Army Major General Matthew W. McFarlane.

The bulk of CJTF-OIR's combat operations have consisted of airstrikes against Islamic State; various ground forces have been deployed including special forces, artillery, training, and military advisors. The United States accounts for the vast majority of airstrikes (75–80%), with the remainder conducted by Australia, Canada, Denmark, France, Jordan, Belgium, the Netherlands, Saudi Arabia, Turkey, the United Arab Emirates, and the United Kingdom. Although the task force is not under NATO, all 30 members of the military alliance are contributing to CJTF-OIR.

By the end of 2017, CJTF-OIR stated that its airstrikes had killed over 80,000 ISIL fighters. The coalition also provided $3.5 billion in military equipment to the Iraqi Armed Forces, billions more to the Peshmerga, and trained 189,000 Iraqi soldiers and police. It has also provided significant support to the Syrian Democratic Forces, with which it coordinates various operations.

The coalition ended its combat mission in Iraq in December 2021, but U.S. troops remain in the country in a training and advisory role.

Structure

As of September 2019, U.S. Army Lieutenant General Robert "Pat" White commanded CJTF-OIR in an appointment which consolidated three commander's tasks. White is also the commander of the U.S. III Corps, which assumed authority over CJTF-OIR from ARCENT on 22 September 2015, turned over its command to XVIII Airborne Corps in August 2016, and then resumed command on 5 September 2017. White has two deputies, a British Army officer, Major General Gerald Strickland, who is currently serving as CJTF-OIR Deputy Commander-Stability, and a U.S. Air Force officer, Major General Alexus G. Grynkewich, who is currently serving as CJTF-OIR Deputy Commander-Operations and Intelligence. CJTF-OIR's headquarters is at Camp Arifjan in Kuwait and includes approximately 700 personnel from 27 nations who are involved in coordinating operations in Iraq and Syria.

Lt. Gen. White handed over operational control to Lt. Gen. Paul Calvert on 9 September, 2020. Command was subsequently passed to Maj. Gen. John Brennan on 9 September 2021.

A dozen countries not involved in combat operations still contribute to the Building Capacity Mission (BPC) in Iraq. Those who have announced their participation in the program, which trains Iraqi security forces, include the United States, the United Kingdom, Australia, Canada, Belgium, Denmark, France, Germany, Italy, the Netherlands, New Zealand, Norway, Slovenia,  and Spain. As a result of the BPC program, nearly 6,500 Iraqi forces completed training, with approximately 5,400 currently in training.

Combined Special Operations Joint Task Force-Levant

Combined Special Operations Joint Task Force-Levant (CSOJTF-Levant) was initially known as Special Operations Joint Task Force-Operation Inherent Resolve (SOJTF-OIR), formed in 2015 as a joint special operations task force that is regarded as spearheading CJTF-OIR's campaign against the Islamic State in Iraq and Syria. CSOJTF-Levant serves under Special Operations Command Central and has trained special operations units in the region.

Special Operations Joint Task Force-Operation Inherent Resolve was restructured, consolidated, and quietly established as Combined Special Operations Joint Task Force-Levant on 1 July 2022. CSOJTF-Levant was to oversee a broader, regional approach to special operations, including activities in Jordan, Lebanon, and Egypt, commanded by Army Brig. Gen. Isaac J. Peltier. According to retired Army general and former USSOCOM and USCENTCOM commander Joseph Votel, the consolidated task force was "a maturing of our overall approach in the region", adding that CSOJTF-Levant combines "multiple SOF headquarters and units that were conducting a variety of missions across" the area of responsibility.

History

From August 2014 to August 2015, coalition aircraft flew a total of 45,259 sorties, with the U.S. Air Force flying the majority (67%) and dropped more than 5,600 bombs, the Royal Air Force conducted 30% of the airstrikes.  At the time, The Guardian reported that a team of independent journalists had published details of 52 airstrikes which killed more than 450 civilians. The coalition acknowledged only 2 non-combatant deaths.

On 3 October 2015, Tunisia announced it would join CJTF–OIR.

By April 2017, CJTF-OIR estimated that it had killed 70,000 Islamic State fighters since 2014, with Special Operations Joint Task Force-Operation Inherent Resolve killing "over 21,000". The War Zone magazine estimated that SOJTF-OIR was responsible "for around 30 percent of all dead terrorists in Iraq and Syria," adding "we don't know whether SOJTF-OIR counts terrorists who died in air or artillery strikes its personnel called in among the task force's final count."

On 14 April 2017, members of SOJTF-OIR's headquarters element received new, distinctive patches, replacing the interim 1st Special Forces Group unit patch.

On 22 December 2018, three days after Donald Trump announced the U.S. would withdraw all its troops from Syria, Brett McGurk, the U.S. envoy to the coalition against ISIL, announced his resignation from his post.

In April 2019, a joint investigation by Amnesty International and Airwars reported that 1,600 civilians were killed by coalition airstrikes and U.S. artillery shelling during the four-month battle to capture the Syrian city of Raqqa from ISIL in 2017. The Coalition states it conducted 34,464 strikes against ISIL targets between 8 August 2014 and end of March 2019, and unintentionally killed at least 1,291 civilians.

On 5 January 2020, Lt. Gen. White posted a statement on his official Twitter account, pausing operations with the Iraqis:
Our first priority is protecting all Coalition personnel committed to the defeat of Daesh. Over the last two months, repeated rocket attacks by elements of Kata'ib Hezbollah have caused the death of Iraqi Security Forces personnel and a U.S. civilian. As a result, we are now fully committed to protecting the Iraqi bases that host Coalition troops. This has limited our capacity to conduct training with partners and support their operations against Daesh and we have paused these activities, subject to continuous review. We remain resolute as partners of the Government of Iraq and the Iraqi people that have welcomed us into their country to help defeat ISIS. We remain ready to return our full attention and efforts back to our shared goal of ensuring the lasting defeat of Daesh.

See also
 
 
 International Security Assistance Force (ISAF)
 Multi-National Force – Iraq (MNF–I)
 Islamic terrorism in Europe

References

External links
 Operational Inherent Resolve – Official Website
 
 
 Defense.gov Special Report: Operation Inherent Resolve
 The Global Coalition – Official Web Site

Joint task forces of the United States Armed Forces
Military units and formations established in 2014
Operation Inherent Resolve
Military operations involving Portugal